Dr. Rotimi Adelola (born 15 August 1958) is a Nigerian psychologist and film producer. Under the Administration of Olusegun Mimiko, he was appointed as the Secretary to the State Government of Ondo State, a position to which he held from 2009 to 2017. As a Psychologist, he worked across the following sectors: academia, manufacturing, consultancy, financial services, oil & gas and the public sector.

Early life and education
Rotimi Adelola was born on August 15, 1958, at Ondo City in Ondo State, Nigeria. Although he was born in Ondo City, his ancestral origin is Araromi-Obu and he is a Prince of the ancient kingdom. He holds a Ph.D. in Organisational Psychology from the University of Ibadan. Earlier, he obtained M.Sc. in Psychology from the University of Lagos and a B.Sc degree (2nd class upper) in Social Sciences from the University of Ife (now Obafemi Awolowo University). Dr. Rotimi Adelola is an alumnus of the International Development Ireland, Dublin, the London Management School and the Harvard-Kennedy School of Government, Harvard University USA.

Filmmaking
Immediately after leaving office in 2017, he attended Mainframe Media And Film Institute owned by Tunde Kelani in Abeokuta, Nigeria and he was trained as a Film Producer. His production studio, NUMBER9 Film Studio, His second movie, The New Patriots, was released on 11 June 2021 in Nigeria.

References

Living people
1958 births
Obafemi Awolowo University alumni
University of Ibadan alumni
University of Lagos alumni
Nigerian Christians
People from Ondo City
Deputy Governors of Rivers State
21st-century Nigerian politicians
People from Ondo State
Nigerian film producers
Nigerian psychologists
Nigerian politicians